Abutilon persicum is a large erect shrub, growing up to 1–2 m high. The stem yields a long and silky fibre which can be used to make rope. It prefers moist deciduous and semi-evergreen forests.

References

persicum
Taxa named by Nicolaas Laurens Burman